Malate dehydrogenase is an enzyme that reversibly catalyzes the oxidation of malate to oxaloacetate using the reduction of NAD+ to NADH.

Malate dehydrogenase may also refer to:

 Malate dehydrogenase (decarboxylating) or NAD-malic enzyme
 Malate dehydrogenase (NADP+)
 Malate dehydrogenase (NAD(P)+)
 Malate dehydrogenase (oxaloacetate-decarboxylating), another NAD-malic enzyme
 Malate dehydrogenase (oxaloacetate-decarboxylating) (NADP+) or NADP-malic enzyme
 Malate dehydrogenase (quinone)

See also
 D-malate dehydrogenase (decarboxylating)
 Malate dehydrogenase 2